The Ferrari Sigma, also known as the Ferrari Sigma Grand Prix, was a Formula One show car built in 1969 by Pininfarina.

Specification 
The Sigma, presented on 13 March 1969 in Geneva, was a prototype, which was never intended to compete in any Formula One races. The main inspiration for creating the car was the fact that many Formula One drivers died in accidents because of low safety standards. The Sigma was built in 1969 in cooperation by Pininfarina and Revue Automobile with the support of Enzo Ferrari, Fiat and Mercedes. The name of the car ("Sigma") was chosen because several years before Pininfarina had built a car with that name.

The car was designed by Paolo Martin. This car was to be a "future car", showing mainly new safety standards. There were many innovations in it, such as a driver survival cell, multi-layer fuel tanks, a fire extinguisher system, plastic fuel-tanks, a safety-belt-system and sidepods protruding behind the rear wheels to prevent interlocking wheels.

The original car is owned by Pininfarina.

References 

Sigma
Formula One cars that never raced